Karoline Georges (born 1970) is a Canadian writer and multidisciplinary artist from Quebec, whose novel De synthèse won the Governor General's Award for French-language fiction at the 2018 Governor General's Awards.

She studied art and film at the Université du Québec à Chicoutimi, and art history at the Université du Québec à Montréal. Her debut novel, La Mue de l'hermaphrodite, was published in 2001, and she has since published novels, short stories, poetry and children's literature.

De synthèse won the Prix Jacques-Brossard in 2018. It was selected for the 2019 edition of Le Combat des livres, where it was defended by broadcaster Manal Drissi.

Works

Novels 
 La Mue de l'hermaphrodite, 2001
 Ataraxie, 2004
 Sous béton, 2011 (English translation Under the Stone, 2016)
 De synthèse, 2017 (English translation The Imago Stage, 2020)

Short stories 
 Variations endogènes, 2014

Children's literature 

 L'Itinérante qui venait du Nord, 2003

Poetry 
 (l'individualiste), 2006

References

External links

1970 births
Living people
21st-century Canadian artists
21st-century Canadian novelists
21st-century Canadian poets
21st-century Canadian short story writers
21st-century Canadian women writers
Canadian women artists
Canadian women novelists
Canadian women poets
Canadian women short story writers
Canadian novelists in French
Canadian poets in French
Canadian short story writers in French
Artists from Montreal
Writers from Montreal
Université du Québec à Chicoutimi alumni
Université du Québec à Montréal alumni
Governor General's Award-winning fiction writers